The Žitomislić Monastery is а Serbian Orthodox monastery  dedicated to the Annunciation and located near Mostar, Bosnia and Herzegovina.

History

Building
In 1566 the Ottoman Empire, as represented by the kadija (qadi) in Nevesinje, granted the Miloradović-Hrabren family a permit to build monastery at Žitomislić over the ruins of an older church. The monastery took more than forty years to complete with the first reference to monks at Žitomislić in 1606. The monastery boasted a highly artistic iconostasis, and housed a scriptorium of considerable activity and renown in its time. At the height of its existence the monastery was supported by large land holdings worked by the monks themselves.

Modern history

Early in the 19th century, the prior, Simeon Miljković, took on improvements to the monastery that included guest quarters, local water, and a new vineyard. A seminary was opened in 1858. The entire brotherhood of Žitomislić monastery was arrested by the Croatian fascist Ustasha on 26 June  1941, and driven to the village of Blizanci, where they were tortured and killed, some being thrown alive into the Vidonja cave-pit.

The monastery was plundered and the entire compound was destroyed with the sole exception of the monastery church. The bodies of the monks were recovered from the pit in 1990 and buried on 3 February 1991, with Serbian Patriarch Pavle (Paul) officiating at the service.

In 1992, Žitomislić was destroyed by the Croatian Defence Council (HVO) as part of the ongoing warfare after the collapse of Yugoslavia.

At that time the library contained dozens of old manuscripts from the 16th and 17th centuries including a small archive of Turkish documents. The treasury was plundered and the buildings, including the cemetery were dynamited and bulldozed to the ground. The stones were left where they fell, however, and when reconstruction of Žitomislić officially began in April 2002, its prior architecture was meticulously reconstructed. In May 2005, the regular session of the Holy Assembly of Bishops of the Serbian Orthodox Church began in the fully restored Žitomislić Monastery.

See also 
List of Serbian Orthodox monasteries
Serbs of Mostar

References

External links

 Official page  
 znanje.org 

Buildings and structures in Mostar
Churches completed in 1606
16th-century Serbian Orthodox church buildings
Christian monasteries established in the 16th century
Serbian Orthodox monasteries in Bosnia and Herzegovina
Attacks on churches in Europe
Ustaše
National Monuments of Bosnia and Herzegovina
Attacks on religious buildings and structures during the Bosnian War
16th-century establishments in Bosnia and Herzegovina
Attacks on religious buildings and structures during World War II